The 1997 World Badminton Grand Prix was the 15th edition of the World Badminton Grand Prix finals. It was held in Istora Senayan, Jakarta, Indonesia, from December 10 to December 14, 1997. The prize money was USD380,000.

Final results

Men's singles

Group A

Group B

Group C

Group D

Knockout stage

Women's singles

Men's doubles

Women's doubles

Mixed doubles

References
Smash: World Grand Prix Finals, Jakarta 1997

External links
BWF: World Grand Prix, Jakarta 1997

World Grand Prix
World Badminton Grand Prix
B
Badminton tournaments in Indonesia